([also ] )  was originally a medieval German term for an outer garment, worn by knights over their armor.

Later,  became the generic term for any military uniform, including dress and parade uniforms, and also referred to epaulettes or shoulder boards with rank insignia, as well as uniform cuffs, badges and other insignia. As of 1945, the term is no longer in use by German speaking armed forces, though the Swedish term for a military tunic is the cognate .

Historical roots
 was derived from the substantive wâfenroc or wâpenroc ("weapon tunic") of knights. It was often made from expensive silk cloth. The colours of this cloth corresponded to those on the shield quartering. In spirit of this, the heraldic figures on the coat of arms were frequently designed by gold and silver embroidery.

In the Prussian Army, the service coat was common called . All German-speaking armies commonly used this wording, except for the Austro-Hungarian Army (later Austrian Army), where the designation  was in use.

World War II use
In its  form as issued in 1935, it was a formfitting thigh-length eight-button tunic of fine  wool, without external pockets.

Officers wore a formal belt of silver braid. Parade dress substituted the steel helmet and jackboots. Semi-formal and walking-out uniforms were as full-dress, but without aiguillette and with ribbons replacing medals.

Historical examples 

The gallery below shows  examples until 1945.

See also 
 Adjustierung
 Tunic (military)

References 

German military uniforms
Military insignia
Military uniforms